The benefit cap is a British Coalition government policy that limits the amount in state benefits that an individual household can claim per year. The benefit cap was introduced in 2013 at £26,000 per year (£500 per week) which was the average family income in the UK. For single people with no children it was set at £18,200 per year (£350 per week). The level of the benefit cap was subsequently lowered following an announcement in the July 2015 United Kingdom budget. From Autumn 2016 it was reduced to £20,000, except in London where it was reduced to £23,000.

The benefit cap was announced in the October 2010 Spending Review by the Coalition Government and was made law by the Welfare Reform Act 2012, The Benefit Cap (Housing Benefit) Regulations 2012 and The Universal Credit Regulations 2013. It began roll out in April 2013 and was fully implemented by September 2013. By 2014 a total of 36,471 households were having their payments reduced by the benefit cap, of which 17,102 were in London.

The policy was a facet of the Coalition government's wide-reaching welfare reform agenda which included the introduction of Universal Credit and reforms of housing benefit and disability benefits. The government cited wide public support for the measure, despite it being highly controversial.

Policy

Cap on household benefits

According to Iain Duncan Smith, Secretary of State for Work and Pensions, the principle behind the household benefit cap is that "people who are on benefits should not be earning more than those, for example, on average earnings".

Affected benefits:
Bereavement Allowance 
Child Benefit 
Child Tax Credit
Employment and Support Allowance
Housing Benefit
Incapacity Benefit
Income Support
Jobseeker's Allowance 
Maternity Allowance 
Severe Disablement Allowance 
Widowed Parent's Allowance 
Universal Credit

Amounts

The following are the total benefits that individual households are limited to.

From April 2013

From November 2016

Exemptions

The initial regulations provided an exemption from the benefit cap for those who received Disability Living Allowance. Those who work enough hours to claim working tax credits are not subject to the benefit cap.

Positions of political parties

Conservatives
The Conservative Party supported the benefit cap which was announced by George Osborne at the 2010 Conservative Party conference.

Labour
Labour Party leader Harriet Harman ordered Labour MPs to abstain during the House of Commons vote on the Welfare Reform and Work Act 2016 which reduced the benefit cap. Forty-eight of them rebelled and voted against the bill, including the future Shadow Chancellor John McDonnell. Previously the Labour Party had expressed support for a regional cap on benefits rather than a national one without expressing a view on where the cap should be set and without stating whether the cap should be higher in London where rents are highest.

Liberal Democrats
The Liberal Democrats supported the introduction of the benefit cap but a notable rebel was Sarah Teather MP, a former Minister for Children and Families in the coalition government, who described the policy as "immoral and divisive" and voted against it in the House of Commons.

Public opinion
Opinion polling showed strong support for the benefit cap. A poll carried out in July 2013 showed that 73% supported the policy and only 12% opposed the policy.

Impact
Concern was expressed that the 2016 reduction in the cap would seriously increase poverty and homelessness among affected families and would affect over 300,000 children. Research by the Chartered Institute of Housing (CIH) indicated that the number of families affected would be higher than the government expected and warned that continuing the policy would make Theresa May’s promise of a “society fairer for families” harder to achieve. Terrie Alafat of the CIH feared that many families could face poverty following a redundancy or ill health. She said: “This could have a severe impact on these families, make housing in large sections of the country unaffordable and risk worsening what is already a growing homelessness problem”. Imran Hussain  of the Child Poverty Action Group said: “A lower benefit cap is crueller and more damaging for children". Once the reduction had come into force, fears were expressed that children's life chances would be affected.

When the benefit cap was introduced in 2013 the Coalition Government predicted that it would reduce public expenditure by £225 million by April 2015. Half of those affected by the benefit cap between 2013 and 2016 lived in London where rents are 61% higher than the national average. Research by the housing charity Shelter in 2015 indicated that the reduction of the benefit cap in 2016 could affect at least 100,000 households, primarily in Southern England, and the charity expressed concerns that those affected might be subjected to homelessness and poverty. In 2017 the UK Council for Psychotherapy said that benefit cuts and sanctions were "having a toxic impact on mental health". Rates of severe anxiety and depression among unemployed people increased from 10.1% in June 2013 to 15.2% in March 2017.  In the general population the increase was from 3.4% to 4.1%.

Statistics published by the Department for Work and Pensions (DWP) indicated that by 2018, 70% of the households that had been subject to the cap were no longer subject to it, amounting to 54,000 households. In that year independent research was published examining 10,000 benefit-capped households. It estimated that the policy had increased the likelihood of moving into work by 21%. However, only 37% of those no longer subject to the cap had become so due to a higher income. For every child affected by the cap whose parents had moved back into work, eight others were living in worse financial circumstances.  Over half of those households subject to the cap remained so for six months or more, and two-thirds of those experienced a shortfall between their monthly income and estimated costs. Overall the average gap between rent and housing benefit for families affected by the cap was £3,750 a year. A study of council tenants in England affected by the cap indicated that they were two-thirds more likely to be in rent arrears than other tenants claiming housing benefits, and that 28% of all households affected by the cap were receiving a discretionary housing payment.

Analysis of DWP figures published in November 2018 carried out by the Labour Party indicated that single women with one or more dependent children made up over 85% of the householders who had their benefits capped (114,337 of the total 134,044). Overall 120,297 single claimant women had their benefits capped, compared with 13,743 single claimant men.

Legal challenges
The benefit cap has been the subject of a number of legal challenges.

2015
The first attempt at a test case of the benefit cap was made in 2013 during the policy's pilot in four London boroughs. Permission was given for a judicial review of the policy on behalf of a number of families, two of the claims involving victims of domestic abuse. Papers submitted to the court suggested that these two families would have to choose between "risking losing their homes, or returning to their abusers in order to escape the imposition of the cap." In November 2013 the High Court dismissed the claim for the judicial review.

In 2015 the Supreme Court issued judgement on the case, R (on the application of SG and others) v Secretary of State for Work and Pensions, concerning an argument made on behalf of the two lone mothers that the benefit cap was discriminatory and unfair. The court ruled by a 3–2 majority verdict that the benefit cap was lawful but three of the five judges concluded that the benefit cap breached the United Nations Convention on the Rights of the Child, to which the UK is a signatory. Supreme Court judge Lord Carnwath recommended that the government review the policy. Deputy president of the court, Lady Hale, said that: "claimants affected by the cap will, by definition, not receive the sums of money which the state deems necessary for them adequately to house, feed, clothe and warm themselves and their children." In reaction to the judgment the work and pensions secretary, Iain Duncan Smith, said: "I am delighted that the country’s highest court has agreed with this government and overwhelming public opinion that the benefit cap is right and fair".

Also in 2015, the benefit cap was the subject of a successful legal challenge on the grounds that it unlawfully discriminated against disabled people and their carers. In 2016 Lord Freud announced the government's intention to exempt those in receipt of Carer's Allowance from the benefit cap, in response to the High Court ruling.

2019
The Supreme Court rejected a subsequent legal challenge made by lone parents who argued that the benefit cap discriminated generally against women, who make up most of the population of single parents, and specifically against lone parents with young children. The court held by a majority of 5–2 that the discriminatory effects are justified.

Reaction

Critical

Writing about the benefit cap in 2013, George Eaton argued in the New Statesman magazine that "the cap is less a serious act of policy than a political weapon designed to trap Labour on the wrong side of the argument". Eaton cited a YouGov poll published earlier that year, which found that 79% of people, including 71% of Labour voters, supported the benefit cap, while 12% opposed it. In the same year The Guardian newspaper argued that, because the benefit cap applied regardless of family size, larger families were likely to be disproportionately affected. And also in 2013, The Children's Society estimated that 140,000 children (1.04% of children in the UK) and 60,000 adults would be affected by the measure.

Positive

Some critics argued that the initial level at which the benefit cap was set was too high. Conservative MPs David Ruffley and Brooks Newmark argued for the benefit cap to be set at £20,000.

See also
 Poverty in the United Kingdom
 United Kingdom government austerity programme

References

External links
UK Government's benefit cap page
Benefit cap

Welfare Reform Act 2012
Social security in the United Kingdom